is a former Japanese football player.

Playing career
Fujihara was born in Mie Prefecture on October 13, 1980. After graduating from high school, he joined J1 League club Cerezo Osaka in 1999. On April 4, 2001, he debuted as substitute goalkeeper against Júbilo Iwata in J.League Cup because regular goalkeeper Kazumasa Kawano got hurt in the matches in the 58th minute. Next match on April 7, he played as starting member against Gamba Osaka in J1 League. However he could only play these matches at the club until 2001. In 2002, he moved to J2 League club Avispa Fukuoka. However he could not play at all in the match. In 2003, he moved to the Japan Football League club Jatco. Although he played in many matches, he got hurt in July and could not play at all after the injury. In addition, the club was disbanded at the end of the 2003 season, and he retired at that time.

Club statistics

References

External links

cerezo.co.jp

1980 births
Living people
Association football people from Mie Prefecture
Japanese footballers
J1 League players
J2 League players
Japan Football League players
Cerezo Osaka players
Avispa Fukuoka players
Jatco SC players
Association football goalkeepers